Otis Wells Johnson (March 12, 1855 – September 27, 1926) was an American manufacturer, banker, and Republican politician.  He represented Racine and Kenosha counties in the Wisconsin Senate during the 1903 and 1905 sessions.

Biography

He attended public schools, and later the University of Maine at Farmington. He was first employed in the lumber industry in St. Ignace, Michigan, later for a while in a Chicago lumberyard, and afterwards at St. Ignace again, where he resided until he came to Racine, Wisconsin in 1890 where he engaged in the manufacture of farm wagons.

Johnson was elected to the Senate as a member of the Republican Party and served from 1903 to 1907.

References

External links
The Political Graveyard

People from Saugatuck, Michigan
Republican Party Wisconsin state senators
1855 births
1926 deaths
People from St. Ignace, Michigan